San Raymundo is a town, with a population of 15,447 (2018 census), and a municipality in the Guatemala department of Guatemala. The municipality has a population of 31,605 (2018 census) and cover an area of 110 km2. It consists of 10 outlying villages and several smaller urbanized areas. San Raymundo is highly populated by both Ladino (Spanish descent) and Indigenous (Mayan descent) people.

References 

Municipalities of the Guatemala Department